Isabel Moreno Pérez (born 28 January 1942) is a Cuban actress.

She has worked in Cuba, Venezuela, and the United States, where she currently resides. She is known for playing characters such as Teresa Trebijo, La Santiaguera, Chachi, La Mexicana, Soledad Mendoza, Cachita, and Bernarda Alba.

Biography
Isabel Moreno was born in Havana on 28 January 1942, the only daughter of Eugenio Moreno and Isabel Pérez. She has been married to actor Gaspar González since the 1970s. They have two daughters and a son.

Early career
Moreno's beginnings were in the theater, where she has spent most of her artistic career, although she has ventured into film and television.

In the 1960s, she became involved in the cultural movement of Havana and the formation of several theater groups. She made her debut as an amateur in the play La taza de café, directed by Juan Rodolfo Aman. She participated in the First Worker and Peasant Theater Festival in 1962 with La fablilla del secreto bien guardado.

In 1961, she joined a group of young actors with training in mime and body language under the orders of the French professor Pierre Chausat. She belonged to theater groups such as the Conjunto Dramático Nacional, Las Mascaras, La Rueda, and Guernica, appearing in plays such as A Streetcar Named Desire, Réquiem por Yarini by Carlos Felipe Hernández, The Threepenny Opera, Aire frío by Virgilio Piñera, and Entremeses japoneses by Yukio Mishima.

She joined Grupo Teatro Estudio in 1969, and remained with it for more than 20 years. She taught at the National Art School of Cuba and the Instituto Superior de Arte for several years. In the early 1990s, she emigrated to Venezuela. In early 2001 she arrived in the United States, where she worked in television and theater, with sporadic appearances in film.

Grupo Teatro Estudio
This was the most fruitful stage of her career in Cuba. In turn, she made several national and international tours with the company to Spain and other European countries. Some of her most prominent roles were:

 El millonario y la maleta by Gertrudis Gómez de Avellaneda ... Gabriela
 Bernarda (Berta Martínez's version of The House of Bernarda Alba by Federico Garcia Lorca) ... Adela
 The Dog in the Manger by Lope de Vega ... Countess Diana
 El becerro de oro by  ... Belén
 El Conde Alarcos by José Jacinto Milanés ... Blanca
 La dolorosa historia de amor secreto de José Jacinto Milanés by Abelardo Estorino ... Carlota
 A Doll's House by Henrik Ibsen ... Nora
 The House of Bernarda Alba by Federico García Lorca ... Adela
 Las impuras by  ... Teresa Trebijo
 Blood Wedding by Federico Garcia Lorca ... The Bride
 Santa Camila de la Habana Vieja by José Ramón Brene ... Camila
 Morir del cuento by Abelardo Estorino ... Delfina the old woman
 ¿Y quién va a tomar café? by José Milián ... The Grandmother

Theater in the United States
 2003: El arte de quejarse or Kvetch, Venevisión Internacional ... The Mother-in-Law
 2007: O.K., Repertorio Español, New York
 2010: The Color of Desire, Actors' Playhouse ... Leandra
 2011: The Misunderstanding, Teatro Avante ... The Mother
 2011: The House of Bernarda Alba, University of Miami Theater Department ... Bernarda Alba
 2012: ARPIAS, Hispanic Theater Guild ... Mildred
 2012–2013: El No, Teatro Avante ... Laura
 2013: Metamorphoses, adapted by Mary Zimmerman, University of Miami Theater Department ... Various characters
 2014: Años difíciles, Teatro Avante ... Olga

Film

Television

References

External links
 

1942 births
Actresses from Havana
Cuban film actresses
Cuban stage actresses
Cuban telenovela actresses
Living people